Kwena Bellemare-Boivin is a Canadian film actress, who garnered a nomination for Best Supporting Actress at the 5th Canadian Screen Awards for her performance in Before the Streets (Avant les rues).

A member of the Atikamekw nation from Wemotaci, Quebec, she is the sister of Rykko Bellemare, who played the film's lead role. She also sings and dances with the Atikamekw traditional music group Northern Voice, and has appeared in the APTN television series Brigade des Nations and Le rythme.

References

External links

Atikamekw people
Canadian film actresses
Canadian television actresses
Actresses from Quebec
Singers from Quebec
Algonquin people
First Nations actresses
First Nations musicians
First Nations dancers
People from Mauricie
Living people
21st-century Canadian dancers
Year of birth missing (living people)